The 1988 Cotton Bowl Classic was a college football bowl game played on January 1, 1988, at the Cotton Bowl in Dallas, Texas. The bowl game featured the Notre Dame Fighting Irish versus the Texas A&M Aggies. Played in front of 73,006 people, Texas A&M won the game by a final score of 35-10. This was the final Cotton Bowl played without a sponsor for the game.

Background
Texas A&M won their third straight Southwest Conference championship and as such was invited to their third straight Cotton Bowl. An added bonus to the 1988 Cotton Bowl was Notre Dame's Tim Brown, a Dallas native and the 53rd winner of the Heisman Trophy.  Brown's presence marked the third time in four seasons the Heisman winner played in the Cotton Bowl.  He also was the Irish's seventh Heisman winner, but the first ever to play in a bowl game. Brown and the Irish were the talk of the town, and the excitement led right up to kickoff.

Notre Dame was making its fifth Cotton Bowl appearance. The Fighting Irish won three of those four, including a 38-10 smashing of Texas A&M's archrival, Texas, in 1978 to win the 1977 national championship. In its most recent Cotton Bowl appearance prior to this one, Joe Montana overcame hypothermia and a 34-12 Houston lead to win 35-34 with a touchdown on the game's final play.

Game summary
The game was barely three minutes old when Brown delivered.  Having returned the opening kickoff 37 yards, Brown helped Notre Dame gain an early lead when quarterback Terry Andrysiak hit his All-America receiver with a 17-yard scoring pass. Down 7-0, the Aggies countered on Scott Slater's 26-yard field goal on the final play of the first quarter, but at that point the game belonged clearly to Notre Dame.  The Irish took the ensuing kickoff and marched 51 yards for Ted Gradel's 36-yard field goal and a 10-3 advantage.

Four minutes later, Notre Dame was on the move again.  Driving from their own 20. Andrysiak and Brown quickly moved the Irish back into scoring position. On second down at the A&M 18, Andrysiak dropped back to pass and his target was tight end Andy Heck. A&M's Alex Morris read the play and made a leaping interception in the corner of the end zone for what proved to be the key play of the game.

The Aggies seized the opportunity and stormed through the Notre Dame defense, needing only six plays to move 80 yards and tie the game.  Freshman running back Darren Lewis ended the drive, surprising the Irish defense by throwing 24 yards to Tony Thompson for the touchdown. Things got worse for Notre Dame.  On their first play following the A&M score, the Irish fumbled the ball back to the Aggies.  Tony Jones made the recovery at the Notre Dame 21 and four plays later, freshman running back Larry Horton carried two yards for the go-ahead score.  A successful two-point conversion pushed the Aggies to an 18-10 half- time lead.  Texas A&M didn't let up in the second half.  Quarterback Bucky Richardson, another one of the Aggies’ talented freshmen, scored twice to ice the game, and Slater added another field goal.

Taking a cue from the offense, Aggie defenders began to dominate, setting up four of A&M's six scores with turnovers.  The A&M “Wrecking Crew,” composed of linebackers Adam Bob,  Aaron Wallace, Dana Batiste, and John Roper, and noseguard Sammy O’Brient, smothered the Notre Dame attack.  After catching six passes for 105 yards in the game's first 22 minutes,  Brown was shut down completely and did not make another reception following Morris’ key interception.  In the fourth quarter, he was ejected from the game for unsportsmanlike conduct. It was a decisive victory for A&M, 35-10.

Aftermath
Notre Dame would win the national championship a year later, sans Brown, who was drafted by the Oakland Raiders.

A&M was put under probation by the NCAA for a period of two years due to violations and thus could not participate in a bowl game for the 1988 NCAA Division I-A football season. Sherill left the program after the 1988 season, and succeeded by R. C. Slocum, who would go to four Cotton Bowls, but lose all four, two (1993 and 1994) to Notre Dame. After two head coaches and two more Cotton Bowl losses, both to future Southeastern Conference rivals, A&M at last won the Cotton Bowl again in 2013 with 2012 Heisman Trophy winner Johnny Manziel.

The Irish have not played in the Cotton Bowl since their back-to-back victories over the Aggies in the 1990s.

References

Cotton Bowl
Cotton Bowl Classic
Notre Dame Fighting Irish football bowl games
Texas A&M Aggies football bowl games
January 1988 sports events in the United States
Cotton